The following is an alphabetical list of articles related to Selangor.

0-9 
 1 Utama
 1974 Federal Territory of Kuala Lumpur Agreement
 1998 Klang Valley water crisis
 2014 Negeri Sembilan and Selangor water crisis

A 
 Abdul Samad of Selangor
 AEON Bukit Tinggi Shopping Centre
 Al-Falah Mosque, Selangor
 Al-Madinah International University
 Ampang (state constituency)
 Ampang and Sri Petaling lines
 Ampang Jaya Municipal Council
 Ampang Recreational Forest
 Ampang, Selangor
 Assunta Hospital

B  
 Bandar Baru Klang
 Bandar Bukit Tinggi
 Bandar Klang (state constituency)
 Bandar Saujana Putra
 Bandar Sri Damansara
 Bandar Sunway
 Bandar Utama
 Batu 11 Cheras
 Batu 20, Kuang
 Batu Caves
 Batu Caves (town)
 Batu Dam
 Batu Tiga
 Batu Tiga-Sungai Buloh Highway
 Beranang
 British Malaya
 Bukit Melawati (state constituency)
 Bukit Raja

C  
 Chempaka (Selangor state constituency)
 Conference of Rulers
 Country Heights
 Cyberjaya
 Cyberjaya University College of Medical Sciences

D 
 Damansara, Selangor
 Damansara-Puchong Expressway
 Dengkil
 Duli Yang Maha Mulia 
 Duta-Ulu Klang Expressway

E  
 Elections in Selangor
 Empire Subang

F  
 Family tree of the Malay monarchs
 Federation of Malaya
 Federated Malay States
 Federated Malay States Railways
 Flag and coat of arms of Selangor
 Football Association of Selangor
 Forest Research Institute Malaysia (FRIM)
 Frank Swettenham

G  
 Gabai River
 German-Malaysian Institute
 Gombak (federal constituency)
 Gombak (town)
 Gombak District
 Gurdwara Sahib Klang

H  
 Hisamuddin of Selangor
 History of Malaysia
 Hulu Langat (federal constituency)
 Hulu Langat District
 Hulu Selangor (federal constituency)
 Hulu Selangor by-election, 2010
 Hulu Selangor District
 Hulu Selangor District Council

I  
 I-City
 Ibrahim Shah of Selangor
 Ijok (state constituency)
 Infrastructure University Kuala Lumpur
 International Islamic University of Malaysia
 International University College of Technology Twintech
 INTI International University
 IOI Mall Puchong
 IPC Shopping Centre
 Istana Alam Shah
 Istana Bukit Kayangan
 Istana Darul Ehsan

J 
 Jalan Ampang
 Jalan Ampang-Hulu Langat
 Jalan Batang Kali-Genting Highlands
 Jalan Batang Kali-Ulu Yam
 Jalan Batu Tiga Lama
 Jalan Besar Salak
 Jalan Hulu Langat
 Jalan Kerja Ayer Lama
 Jalan Klang Lama
 Jalan Kuala Selangor-Bestari Jaya
 Jalan Rawang-Bestari Jaya
 Jalan Sabak Bernam-Hulu Selangor
 Jalan Sultan Abdul Samad, Kuala Lumpur
 Jalan Sungai Tengi
 Jalan Sungai Tua
 Jalan Ulu Yam
 Japanese occupation of Malaya
 Jenjarom
 Jeram (state constituency) 
 Jugra

K  
 Kajang
 Kajang Hospital
 Kajang Municipal Council
 Kampung Kuantan
 Kampung Sungai Pusu
 Kapar
 Kapar (federal constituency)
 KDU University College
 Kelana Jaya line
 Kerling, Selangor
 Klang (city)
 Klang (federal constituency)
 Klang-Banting Highway
 Klang Bell
 Klang District
 Klang Gates Dam
 Klang High School
 Klang Komuter station
 Klang Municipal Council
 Klang Parade
 Klang River
 Klang Royal Town Mosque
 Klang Sentral
 Klang Valley
 Klang War
 Kolej Universiti Islam Antarabangsa Selangor
 Kota Darul Ehsan
 Kota Kemuning
 Kota Raja (Selangor state constituency)
 Kuala Kubu Bharu
 Kuala Langat (federal constituency)
 Kuala Langat District
 Kuala Langat District Council
 Kuala Lumpur
 Kuala Lumpur-Kuala Selangor Expressway
 Kuala Lumpur International Airport
 Kuala Selangor
 Kuala Selangor (federal constituency)
 Kuala Selangor District
 Kuala Selangor District Council
 Kuala Selangor Nature Park
 Kuala Sungai Buloh
 Kuang (town)
 Kundang

L  
 Langat River
 Laws of the Constitution of Selangor 1959
List related to Selangor
 List of bus routes in Kuala Lumpur
 List of honours of Selangor awarded to heads of state and royalty
 List of honours of the Selangor Royal Family by country
 List of Menteris Besar of Selangor
 List of monarchies 
 List of people on the postage stamps of Malaysia
 List of post-nominal letters (Selangor)
 List of postal codes in Malaysia
 List of schools in Selangor
 List of tourist attractions in Selangor
 Limkokwing University of Creative Technology

M  
 Malay Annals
 Malaya Command
 Malayan El'Clasico
 Malayan Union
 Malaysia
 Malaysia University of Science & Technology
 Mines Wellness City
 Management and Science University
 Merdeka Square, Kuala Lumpur
 Mestika Palace
 Monarchies in Malaysia
 Morib
 MPPJ F.C.
 Muhammad Shah of Selangor
 Multimedia University
 Musa Ghiatuddin Riayat Shah of Selangor

N  
 National Zoo of Malaysia
 National University of Malaysia
 Nature Sites in Selangor
 New Klang Valley Expressway
 New North Klang Straits Bypass
 North Klang Straits Bypass

O  
 Order of precedence in Selangor
 Order of Sultan Salahuddin Abdul Aziz Shah
 Order of Sultan Sharafuddin Idris Shah
 Order of the Crown of Selangor
 Orders, decorations, and medals of Selangor
 Orders, decorations, and medals of the Malaysian states and federal territories

P  
 Pandamaran
 Pelabuhan Kelang (federal constituency)
 Pelabuhan Klang (state constituency)
 Peninsular Malaysia
 Perbadanan Kemajuan Negeri Selangor Sports Complex
 Permaisuri Siti Aishah
 Perodua
 Petaling (federal constituency)
 Petaling District
 Petaling Jaya
 Petaling Jaya (federal constituency)
 Petaling Jaya City Council
 Petaling Jaya Selatan (federal constituency)
 Petaling Jaya Utara (federal constituency)
 PKNS F.C.
 Port Klang
 Port Klang Komuter station
 PROTON Holdings
 Public Bank F.C.
 Puchong
 Puchong (federal constituency)
 Puchong Jaya
 Pulau Meranti
 Puchong Perdana
 Pulau Ketam
 Putra Heights
 Putra Heights LRT station
 Putrajaya

Q

R  
 Raja Lumu
 Rasa, Malaysia
 Rawang (federal constituency)
 Rawang, Selangor
 Rojak Klang
 Royal Family Order of Selangor
 Royal Selangor
 Royal Selangor Club
 Royal Selangor Golf Club

S 
 Sabak (state constituency)
 Sabak Bernam (federal constituency)
 Sabak Bernam District
 Sabak Bernam District Council
 Salahuddin of Selangor
 Salak Tinggi
 SEGi University
 Sekinchan
 Selangor Council of the Royal Court
 Selangor FA
 Selangor FM
 Selangor honours list
 Selangor Labour Party
 Selangor League
 Selangor Masters
 Selangor River
 Selangor royal family
 Selangor State Development Corporation
 Selangor state election, 2018
 Selangor State Executive Council
 Selangor State Legislative Assembly
 Selangor State Park
 Selangor Sultanate
 Selangor Turf Club
 Selangor United
 Selangor water works
 Selayang
 Selayang (federal constituency)
 Selayang Municipal Council
 Semenyih Dam
 Sepang (federal constituency)
 Sepang District 
 Sepang Municipal Council
 Sepang International Circuit
 Serdang (federal constituency)
 Serdang (Selangor state constituency)
 Serdang Hospital
 Serendah
 Seri Kembangan
 Seri Serdang (state constituency)
 Shah Alam
 Shah Alam (federal constituency)
 Shah Alam Circuit
 Shah Alam City Council
 Shah Alam Stadium
 Sharafuddin of Selangor
 Sijangkang
 Simpang Airport
 South Klang Valley Expressway
 SPCA Selangor, Malaysia
 State legislative assemblies of Malaysia
 States and federal territories of Malaysia
 Subang Jaya
 Subang Jaya Municipal Council
 Subang Parade
 Subang, Selangor
 Sulaiman of Selangor
 Sultan Abdul Aziz Royal Gallery
 Sultan Abdul Aziz Shah Airport
 Sultan Abdul Samad Building
 Sultan Abdul Samad Mausoleum
 Sultan of Selangor Cup
 Sultan Salahuddin Abdul Aziz Mosque
 Sultan Salahuddin Abdul Aziz Shah Building
 Sungai Besar
 Sungai Buloh
 Sungai Buloh Hospital
 Sungai Buloh–Kajang MRT line
 Sungai Choh
 Sungai Pinang (Selangor state constituency)
 Sunway Lagoon
 Sunway Pyramid
 Sunway University

T  
 Taman Sri Muda
 Taman Templer (state constituency)
 Tanjung Harapan
 Tanjung Sepat, Selangor
 Taylor's University
 Telephone numbers in Malaysia
 Teluk Datok
 Tengku Amir Shah
 Tengku Ampuan Jemaah
 Tengku Ampuan Rahimah
 Tengku Ampuan Rahimah Hospital
 Tengku Permaisuri Norashikin
 Tengku Putra
 Tengku Sulaiman Shah
 Tengku Zatashah
 The Curve (shopping mall)
 Tun Abdul Razak University
 Tun Perak
 TVSelangor

U  
 UCSI University
 UEP Subang Jaya
 Ulu Klang
 Ulu Yam
 Universiti Putra Malaysia
 Universiti Teknologi MARA
 Universiti Tenaga Nasional
 Universiti Tunku Abdul Rahman
 University of Selangor

V

W

X

Y  
 Yang di-Pertuan Agong
 Yap Ah Loy

Z

See also 
 Topic overview:
 Selangor
 Outline of Selangor

Selangor
Indexes of topics by region